Dalwood is an English language surname. People with this name include:

Dexter Dalwood (born 1960), English artist
Hubert Dalwood Hubert Cyril "Nibs" Dalwood ARA (1924–1976), British sculptor
Peter Dalwood (1922–2000), Australian rules footballer
William Trevett Dalwood (c. 1834–1909), partner in South Australian telegraph line contractors Darwent & Dalwood